Lofthouse and Outwood railway station served the Outwood area of Wakefield, West Yorkshire, England. It was opened by the Methley Joint Railway in 1869, 1876 and closed in 1957. Here the line from Lofthouse Junction on the line between Cutsyke and Methley of the Lancashire and Yorkshire Railway joined the GNR line between Leeds and Wakefield in a triangular junction, of which the station formed the southern corner. It was situated south of Outwood railway station which was opened in 1988 and south of the bridge of Lingwell Gate Lane.

References 

Disused railway stations in Wakefield
Former Methley Joint Railway stations
Railway stations in Great Britain opened in 1869
Railway stations in Great Britain closed in 1958